Satires are cultural texts in which vices, follies, abuses, and shortcomings are held up to ridicule.

Satires may also refer to:

 Satires (Horace), a collection of satirical poems
 Satires (Juvenal), a collection of satirical poems

See also

 Satyrs